Raymond Strid (born 1956 in Stockholm, Sweden) is a Swedish drummer in the genre of free jazz and the new European improvised music.

Biography 

When Strid picked up drumming, he was inspired by musicians like Han Bennink, Paul Lytton, and Tony Oxley. He started his musical career relatively late. His debut concert was in September 1977, after first playing with a variety of local bands in Stockholm. In 1988 he founded the 'GUSH' trio together with saxophonist Mats Gustafsson and the pianist Sten Sandell. Since that time Strid has played in a series of bands and projects, such as in the trio Guy/Gustafsson/Strid, Marilyn Crispell/Anders Jormin/Raymond Strid and the Free Jazz trio LSB with Fredrik Ljungkvist and Johan Berthling. In 2000 he initiated 'The Electrics' with Axel Dörner, Sture Ericson and Ingebrigt Flaten. The same year Strid joined the Barry Guy New Orchestra. Strid played at numerous festivals of free improvisation in Europe and North America. He also teaches in musical improvisation.

Discography 

 With 'The Too Much Too Soon Orchestra'
 1988: Saw - Music For Instruments And Machines (Radium 226.05)
 1996: What Is The Point Of Paris? (Fylkingen Records), with Dror Feiler

 With the 'Gush' trio
 1990: Tjo Och Tjim (Dragon Records)
 1991: From Things To Sounds (Dragon Records)
 1996: Gushwachs (Bead Records)
 1997: Live At Fasching (Dragon Records)
 1999: Live In Tampere (Dragon Records)
 2005: Electric Eel (Qbico)
 2005: Norrköping (Atavistic)
 2015: The March (Konvoj Records)

 With Paul Pignon
 1992: Far From Equilibrium (Alice Musik Produktion)

 With Marilyn Crispell
 1994: Spring Tour (Alice Musik Produktion)

 With Guy-Gustafsson-Strid Trio
 1996: You Forget to Answer (Maya Recordings)
 1997: Gryffgryffgryffs: The 1996 Radio Sweden Concert (Music And Arts Programs Of America, Inc.), with Marilyn Crispell
 2008: Tarfala (Maya Recordings)

 With Mats Gustafsson & 'Nu-Ensemblen'
 1997: Hidros One (Caprice Records)

 With 'LSB', trio including Fredrik Ljungkvist and Johan Berthling
 2001: Walk, Stop, Look And Walk (Crazy Wisdom, Universal Music AB)
 2003: Fungus (Moserobie Music Production)

 With Barry Guy New Orchestra
 2001: Inscape–Tableaux (Intakt Records)
 2005: Oort–Entropy (Intakt Records)
 2013: Mad Dogs (Not Two Records)
 2014: Mad Dogs On The Loose (Not Two Records)
 2014: Amphi • Radio Rondo (Intakt Records)

 With Ken Vandermark, Sten Sandell, David Stackenas, and Kjell Nordeson
 2002: Two Days In December (Wobbly Rail)

 With 'Unsolicited Music Ensemble' including Martin Küchen and Tony Wren
 2002: Bulbs (Slam Productions)

 With 'The Electrics'
 2002: Chain Of Accidents (Ayler Records)
 2006: Live At Glenn Miller Café (Ayler Records)
 2013: Fylkingen (ILK Music)

 With 'UNSK' quartet including Birgit Ulher, Martin Küchen, and Lise-Lott Norelius
 2004: Tidszon (Creative Sources)

 With 'Martin Küchen Trio', including Per Zanussi
 2007: Live At Glenn Miller Café (Ayler Records)

 With Joëlle Léandre and François Houle
 2007: 9 Moments (Red Toucan Records)
 2010: Last Seen Headed: Live At Sons D'Hiver (Ayler Records)

 With Per Anders Nilsson and Sten Sandell
 2009: Beam Stone (Psi)

 With 'Trespass Trio' including Martin Küchen and Per Zanussi
 2009: ...Was There To Illuminate The Night Sky.. (Clean Feed)
 2012: "Bruder Beda" (Clean Feed)
 2013: Human Encore (Clean Feed), with Joe McPhee

 With Pat Thomas and Clayton Thomas
 2010: Wazifa (Psi)

 With Kege Snö
 2010: Keijsaren Gripen Efter Strid På Barnö (Umlaut Records), with Niklas Barnö, Joel Grip, and Roland Keijser

 With Roland Keijser
 2011: Yellow Bell (Umlaut Records)

 With 'Tarfala Trio', including Barry Guy and Mats Gustafsson
 2011: Syzygy (NoBusiness Records)

 With Mats Gustafsson and John Russell
 2012: Birds (dEN Records)

 With Lonberg-Holm, Strid Duo
 2012: Discus And Plumbing (Peira)

 With 'Trespass Trio' & Joe McPhee
 2013: Human Encore (Clean Feed), with Martin Küchen and Per Zanussi

 With 'Pipeline'
 2013: Pipeline (Corbett vs. Dempsey)

 With 'Fire! Orchestra'
 2013: Exit! (Rune Grammofon)
 2014: Enter (Rune Grammofon)

 With Andreas Backer
 2015: Voice & Percussion (Creative Sources)

 With Henrik Munkeby Nørstebø and Nina de Heney	
 2015: Oslo Wien (Va Fongool)

References

External links 
 
 Gush (Mats Gustafsson, Sten Sandell, Raymond Strid) at Mediawave 2013, Komárom at YouTube

1956 births
Living people
Musicians from Stockholm
20th-century drummers
21st-century drummers
Swedish jazz drummers
Swedish jazz composers
Male jazz composers
Avant-garde jazz musicians
20th-century Swedish male musicians
20th-century Swedish musicians
21st-century Swedish male musicians